Bia Bulcão (born 4 December 1993) is a Brazilian fencer. She competed in the women's foil event at the 2016 Summer Olympics. In 2017, she won the bronze medal in the women's team foil event at the 2017 Pan American Fencing Championships held in Montreal, Canada.

See also
 List of Pennsylvania State University Olympians

References

External links
 

1993 births
Living people
Brazilian female foil fencers
Olympic fencers of Brazil
Fencers at the 2016 Summer Olympics
Place of birth missing (living people)
Pan American Games medalists in fencing
Pan American Games bronze medalists for Brazil
Fencers at the 2019 Pan American Games
Medalists at the 2019 Pan American Games
21st-century Brazilian women